Amphilius pedunculus is a species of fish in the family Amphiliidae, first found in the Malagarasi River drainage, as well as Lake Rukwa and Rufiji River basins, and upper Great Ruaha River drainage.

References

pedunculus
Freshwater fish of Tanzania
Fish described in 2015
Taxa named by Lawrence M. Page